The 2013–14 season in Primera División de Nicaragua will be divided into two tournaments (Apertura and Clausura) and will determine the 63rd and 64th champions in the history of the league. It will also provide the sole berth for the 2014–15 CONCACAF Champions League. The Apertura tournament will be played in the second half of 2013, while the Clausura will be played in the first half of 2014.

General

Promotion and relegation
 At the end of the 2012–13, ART Jalapa, FC San Marcos and Real Madriz were promoted to Primera Division
 At the end of the 2012–13, Xilotepelt were relegated to Segunda Division.

Changes in competition formats
 The Primera Division was expanded to 10 clubs.

Team information
Last updated: June 28, 2013

Personnel and sponsoring (2013 Apertura)

Managerial changes

During the season

Apertura
The 2013 Apertura was the first tournament of the season. It began in  2013.

Regular season
The regular season began in August 2012. The top four finishers will move on to the next stage of the competition.

Standings

Results

Positions by round

Playoffs

Semi-finals

First leg

Second leg

Real Estelí won 4–1 on aggregate.

Walter Ferretti won 2–1 on aggregate

Finals

First leg

Second leg

 Real Esteli won 1–0 on aggregate score.

Top scorers

Updated to games played on 7 November 2013

List of foreign players in the league
This is a list of foreign players in Apertura 2013. The following players:
have played at least one apertura game for the respective club.
have not been capped for the Nicaragua national football team on any level, independently from the birthplace

A new rule was introduced this year, that clubs can have upwards of six foreign players in a squad, However some conditions include: The player has to be younger than 30 years old, spent year abroad away from Nicaragua, and clubs can only have five foreign players on the field at one time .

ART Jalapa
  Luis Maradiaga

Chinandega
  Edwin Samayoa
  Jaime Crisanti
  Samuel Kerr
  Luis Sinclair
  Javier Haedo
  Ramón Ferreira

Diriangén FC
  Diego Brutto
  Rodrigo Lucas Martella
  Wendell Porras
  Kevin Arrieta
  Harold Villalobos

Juventus Managua
  Ronny Colon
  Darwin Guity
  Juan José Tablada
  Jose Armando Cruz
  Abel Dominguez

Managua
  Luis Fernando Gonzales
  Oscar Castillo
  Anderson Palacios
  Erick Sierra

 (player released mid season)

Ocotal
  Byron Maradiago
  Marcos Rivera
  Marlon Cruz
  Jonathan Juarez 
  José Mejía Benedict
  Jose Luis Fernandez

Real Esteli
  Elmer Mejia
  Alan Kardek
  Leandro Teofilo Santos
  Iuri Oliveira    
  Douglas de Souza Ferreira
  Jonathan Joaelton Sampaio

Real Madriz
  Luis Valladarez
  José Luis Palacios
  Edwin Castillo
  Pedro Melendez

San Marcos
   Carlos Javier Martino
   Moisés Leguías
   Ramón Pedroza

Walter Ferretti
  Luis Fernando Copete
  Dani Cadena
  Pedrinho
  Maycon
  Michell Williams
  Victor Lozano

Clausura
The 2014 Clausura was the first tournament of the season. It began on 4 January 2014. Real Esteli F.C. are the defending champion. The league will consist of 10 teams, each playing a home and away game against the other clubs for a total of 18 games, respectively. The top four teams at the end of the regular season will take part of the playoffs.

Team information
Last updated: December 1, 2013

Personnel and sponsoring (2014 Clausura)

Managerial Changes

Beginning of the season

During the season

Regular season
The regular season began in 2014. The top four finishers will move on to the next stage of the competition.

Standings

Results

Positions by round

Playoffs

Semi-finals

First leg

Second leg

Real Estelí won 10–2 on aggregate.

Diriangén FC 2-2 on aggregate won on the away goal rule

Finals

First leg

Second leg

 Real Esteli FC won 2-1 on aggregate score.

Top scorers

Updated to games played on 13 January 2014

List of foreign players in the league
This is a list of foreign players in Clausura 2014. The following players:
have played at least one apertura game for the respective club.
have not been capped for the Nicaragua national football team on any level, independently from the birthplace

A new rule was introduced this year, that clubs can have upwards of six foreign players in a squad, However some conditions include: The player has to be younger than 30 years old, spent year abroad away from Nicaragua, and clubs can only have five foreign players on the field at one time .

ART Jalapa
  Luis Maradiaga
  Chanel Norales Suazo

Chinandega
  Victor Norales
  Jesus Graizabal
  Pedro de la Rosa
  Juan Acevedo

Diriangén FC
  Alex Expósito 
  Jose Luis Rodriguez

Juventus Managua
  Israel Lainez
  Juan José Tablada
  Kazumichi Ikeda
  Jonathan Castillo

Managua
  Luis Fernando Gonzales
  Oscar Castillo
  Erick Sierra

 (player released mid season)

Ocotal
  Byron Maradiago
  Marcos Rivera
  Jorge Valladares
  Byron Josue Sauceda 
  José Francisco Valladares 
  Yitson Lameda

Real Esteli
  Elmer Mejia
  Alberto Heredia Ceballos
  Javier Vitavar
  Mauro Rodríguez
  Sebastián Borba
  Rodrigo Valiente Baraybar

Real Madriz
  Luis Valladarez
  Jose Luis Cassiani
  Alexander Quiñonez
  Ramon Uriarte
  Marlon Barrios

San Marcos
  Allan Marbella Morales
  Keysi Guerreo

Walter Ferretti
  Pedrinho
  Luis Fernando Copete
  Michell Williams
  Dani Cadena
  Nicklas Elving
  Bernardo Laureiro

Aggregate table

External links
 https://int.soccerway.com/national/nicaragua/1a-division/2013-2014/apertura/

Nicaraguan Primera División seasons
1
Nicaragua